George Allan Kell (born 9 April 1949) is an English former amateur footballer who played as a wing half in the Football League for Darlington and in non-league football for Spennymoor United. Kell made two appearances for Darlington, both as a substitute, in the last two matches of the 1967–68 Fourth Division season.

References

1949 births
Living people
People from Spennymoor
Footballers from County Durham
English footballers
Association football wing halves
Darlington F.C. players
Spennymoor United F.C. players
English Football League players